Solanum glaucophyllum is a species of plant in the family Solanaceae. It is known as waxyleaf nightshade. It is native to Brazil, Bolivia, Argentina, Paraguay and Uruguay.

It is usually classified under the section Cyphomandropsis, within the subgenus Bassovia.

It is a rhizomatous plant with a simple stem and shortly branched, growing to  1–2 m tall or more. The leaves are simple, ovate, lanceolate, greenish-gray, and the plant produces 1–2 cm long, bluish purple flowers. The fruit is a globose berry 1–2 cm in diameter, blue-black, and features several seeds inside. It propagates vegetatively by gemmiferous roots of high regeneration capacity in water-saturated soils like edges of lakes.

Its consumption by ruminants produces an illness on them.

References

External links

glaucophyllum
Plants described in 1829
Taxa named by René Louiche Desfontaines